Araeopteron papaziani is a species of moth of the family Erebidae first described by Christian Guillermet in 2009.
It is found on Réunion, Comoros, Madagascar and Mauritius.

Its wingspan is 8–11 mm.

References

Moths described in 2009
Boletobiinae
Moths of Africa